Komi De (Ԁ ԁ; italics: Ԁ ԁ) is a letter of the Molodtsov alphabet, a version of Cyrillic. It was used only in the writing of the Komi language in the 1920s. 

The lowercase form resembles the lowercase of the Latin letter D (d d) and its uppercase form resembles a rotated capital Latin letter P or Cyrillic letter Er or a reversed soft sign. 

This sound is represented by the Cyrillic letter De (Д д) in other Cyrillic alphabets.

Computing codes

See also 
Cyrillic characters in Unicode

Languages of Russia
Cyrillic letters
Komi language
Mordvinic languages
Permic languages